Rathi (Hindi:राठी), also synonymous with its variant Rath, is a breed of cattle indigenous to India. It originated in the region of the state of Rajasthan consisting of Bikaner, Ganganagar and Hanumangarh districts. It is an important dual purpose cattle breed of India known for both its milking and draught prowess. The cattle is locally known to have two variants, Rathi is a draft breed while Rath is a pure milch variant. The Rath variant originated in the Alwar district of Rajasthan and was domesticated by Rath tribe. Rath is characterized by its white skin with black or gray spots while Rathi is usually of brown colour.

It is well suited for hotter regions of India. Places in Karnataka like Bellary , Gulbarga , Davanagere , sanodoor, and many other places are suitable for this breed.

See also
List of breeds of cattle

References 

Cattle breeds originating in India
Cattle breeds
Animal husbandry in Rajasthan